George Edgar (11 June 1877 – April 1918) was an English writer and journalist.

He was the eldest son of Peter Edgar, of Warrington, married the youngest daughter of Thomas D Howard, of Dewsbury, and had four children.
After working with local newspapers, he found employment with London journals, and became editor or associate editor of “Modern Business” [1909], “Careers” [1910-11] and “Advertizers’ Weekly”.
He wrote and contributed widely, including many fictional works. In later life he lived in Ramsgate.

Published works

References

English writers
1877 births
1918 deaths
People from Warrington
People from Ramsgate